E. Von Dahl Killed the Locals is the debut studio album by pop punk group The Matches. It was originally self-released in 2003 and later re-released on May 11, 2004 via Epitaph Records.

The self-release contained the track "Superman" which was removed from the Epitaph re-release because the band felt it would be a good bonus to those fans who had been with them from the beginning. The versions of "Scratched Out" and "The Jack Slap Cheer" that appear on the Epitaph Records version each have changed lyrics due, in both cases, to copyright liability. The Epitaph re-release contained two new tracks, "Borderline Creep" and "More Than Local Boys" although "Superman" was removed and "Scratched Out" was renamed as "Track 11".

The album title is a reference to the band's legal battle with Yvonne Doll and their subsequent name change from The Locals to The Matches.

Track listing

Personnel
The following credits are presented for the original 2003 release, adapted from Discogs

Shawn Harris – lyrics, vocals, guitar, artwork
Justin San Souci – lyrics (track 10), vocals, bass, artwork
Jonathan Devoto – vocals, guitar
Matt Whalen – drums
Mike Harwood – lyrics
Matt Esposito – lyrics (tracks: 3, 5, 8)
Vanessa Harris – vocals (track 11)
Rene Carranza – synthesizer, percussion & keyboards (track 11)
Mo Juanson – blues harp (track 9)
Mike Green – additional guitar (track 4), engineering (tracks: 1, 2, 10), additional producer (track 2), producer & recording (tracks: 3-6, 8, 11)
Matt Radosevich – producer & recording (tracks: 1, 2, 7, 9, 10)
Alex Studer – engineering (track 4)
Miles Hurwitz – producer, management
Mark Chalecki – mastering
Gene Grimaldi – mastering (for Epitaph re-release only)
Joe Barresi – producer & mixing (for Epitaph re-release only)

Release history

References

External links 

2003 debut albums
The Matches albums
Self-released albums
Epitaph Records albums
Albums produced by Mike Green (record producer)